Carol Goodman, also known under the pseudonym Juliet Dark, is an American professor and author of gothic fiction. She has also written under the pseudonym Lee Carroll with her husband Lee Slonimsky. Goodman currently serves as a creative writing professor at the State University of New York at New Paltz.

Bibliography
The Lake of Dead Languages (2002, Ballantine Books)
The Seduction of Water (2003, Ballantine Books) 
The Drowning Tree (2004, Ballantine Books)
The Ghost Orchid (2006, Ballantine Books)
The Sonnet Lover (2007, Ballantine Books)
The Night Villa (2008, Ballantine Books)
Arcadia Falls (2010, Ballantine Books)
River Road (2016, Touchstone)
The Widow's House (2017, William Morrow)
The Metropolitans (2017, Viking) 
The Other Mother (2018)
The Night Visitor (2019)
The Sea of Lost Girls (2020)

The Fairwick Chronicles (as Juliet Dark)
The Demon Lover (2011, Ballantine Books)
The Water Witch (2012, Ballantine Books)
The Angel Stone (2013, Ballantine Books)

Black Swan Rising (as Lee Carroll, with Lee Slominsky)
Black Swan Rising (2010, Tor Books)
The Watchtower (2011, Tor Books)
The Shape Stealer (2013, Bantam Press)

Blythewood Trilogy
Blythewood (2013, Viking Books for Young Readers)
Ravencliffe (2014, Viking Books for Young Readers)
Hawthorn (2015, Viking Books for Young Readers)

References

External links
 

21st-century American novelists
American women novelists
State University of New York at New Paltz faculty
Novelists from New York (state)
21st-century American women writers
Year of birth missing (living people)
21st-century pseudonymous writers
Pseudonymous women writers